Rick George has been the athletic director at the University of Colorado since August 2013. 

Before joining the University of Colorado, George worked for the Texas Rangers. He joined the club in October 2010. In March 2013, George was promoted from COO to president of business operations.

References

Year of birth missing (living people)
Place of birth missing (living people)
Living people
Colorado Buffaloes athletic directors